Regionalcargo Holdings, S.A. de C.V., operating as Regional Cargo, was a Mexican cargo airline. Its headquarters are on the grounds of Querétaro International Airport and in Colón, Querétaro, near Santiago de Querétaro.

History 
Regional Cargo was founded by Juan M. Rodríguez Anza, Ernesto Díaz González and Juan Ignacio Steta, so it is run by 100% Mexican capital with the investment of investors that saw in this company a big opportunity of development in this sector.

The airline started operations at the city of Querétaro on July 7, 2006.

Destinations 
Regional Cargo operated the following scheduled services:

Mexico
Guadalajara - Don Miguel Hidalgo y Costilla International Airport
Mexico City - Mexico City International Airport 
La Paz - Manuel Márquez de León International Airport
Monterrey - General Mariano Escobedo International Airport
Querétaro - Querétaro International Airport hub
Toluca - Lic. Adolfo López Mateos International Airport
Puebla - Hermanos Serdán International Airport
Mérida - Manuel Crescencio Rejón International Airport
Cancún - Cancún International Airport

Fleet 
The Regional Cargo fleet included the following aircraft (as of 8 November 2008) :

 ATR 42-300F
 Boeing 737-200C

References

External links 

Regional Cargo
Regional Cargo 
Regional Cargo Fleet

Defunct airlines of Mexico
Cargo airlines